Otto Kittel (21 February 1917 – 14 or 16 February 1945) was a German fighter pilot during World War II. He flew 583 combat missions on the Eastern Front, claiming 267 aerial victories, making him the fourth highest scoring ace in aviation history according to authors John Weal and Jerry Scutts. Kittel claimed all of his victories against the Red Air Force.

Kittel joined the Luftwaffe in 1939, and, in spring 1941, he was posted to Jagdgeschwader 54 (JG 54—54th Fighter Wing) supporting Army Group North on the Eastern Front. He received the Knight's Cross of the Iron Cross on 29 October 1943, for reaching 120 aerial victories. During the remainder of World War II, Kittel was credited with 144 more aerial victories and was awarded the Knight's Cross of the Iron Cross with Oak Leaves and Swords.  He was shot down by Soviet aircraft and killed in February 1945. Kittel was the most successful German fighter pilot to be killed in action.

Personal life
Kittel was born on 21 February 1917 in Sudeten Silesia, Austria-Hungary. After working briefly as an auto mechanic, Kittel joined the Luftwaffe in 1939. Kittel married his fiancé, Edith, in June 1942; the couple had a son, born in 1942.

World War II
Kittel's first operations were air superiority missions in support of the German invasion of Yugoslavia, including the bombing of Belgrade, which killed up to 17,000 civilians, destroyed the National Library of Serbia, and damaged the Belgrade Zoo. For Operation Barbarossa, JG 54 was moved to East Prussia, in early June 1941. The unit supported Army Group North in its advance through the Baltic states towards Leningrad. On 24 June 1941, Kittel claimed his first two aerial victories, two Tupolev SB-2 bombers. His tally had risen to 19 by May 1942. On 19 February 1943, Kittel achieved his 39th victory.

During the fighting in 1943, JG 54 took part in the spring battles over the Crimea Peninsula, Vyazma-Bryansk, Vitebsk, Kharkov, Orsha and Orel regions. During the Battle of Kursk, Kittel's unit escorted Junkers Ju 87 Stukas of a dive bomber wing commanded by Hans-Ulrich Rudel. On 14 September 1943, Kittel claimed his 100th aerial victory, a Yakovlev Yak-9 fighter. The 53rd Luftwaffe pilot to achieve the century mark, he received the Knight's Cross of the Iron Cross on 29 October 1943. On 1 November 1943, Kittel was promoted to the rank of Leutnant (second lieutenant).

In early April 1944, Kittel achieved his 150th aerial victory. On April 14, he was awarded the Knight's Cross of the Iron Cross with Oak Leaves for his 152nd aerial victory, claimed on 12 April. Kittel received the Oak Leaves from Adolf Hitler at the Berghof on 5 May 1944. In May 1944, the 2 wing was transferred to augment the 3rd group of JG 54 fighting on the Western Front to provide air defense over Germany against Allied aerial attacks. In August 1944, Kittel was appointed squadron leader. Kittel was credited with his 200th aerial victory on 23 August 1944. He was awarded the Knight's Cross of the Iron Cross with Oak Leaves and Swords on 25 November 1944.

On 14 or 16 February 1945, Kittel took off with his wing flying Fw 190 to engage a formation of 14 Shturmovik aircraft over the Courland Pocket. His wingman later reported that his aircraft was hit, descended towards the ground on fire and crashed in flames.

Summary of career

Aerial victory claims
According to US historian David T. Zabecki, Kittel was credited with 267 aerial victories. Mathews and Foreman, authors of Luftwaffe Aces — Biographies and Victory Claims, researched the German Federal Archives and found records for 265 aerial victory claims, plus three further unconfirmed claims. All of his aerial victories were claimed on the Eastern Front. Victory claims were logged to a map-reference (PQ = Planquadrat), for example "PQ 44793". These sectors were then subdivided into 36 smaller units to give a location area 3 × 4 km in size.

Awards
 Wound Badge in Black
 Honorary Cup of the Luftwaffe on 21 December 1942 as Feldwebel and pilot
 Front Flying Clasp of the Luftwaffe in Gold with Pennant "500"
 Combined Pilots-Observation Badge
 German Cross in Gold on 18 March 1943 as Feldwebel in the 2./Jagdgeschwader 54
 Iron Cross (1939)
 2nd Class (30 June 1941)
 1st Class (October 1941)
 Knight's Cross of the Iron Cross with Oak Leaves and Swords
 Knight's Cross on 29 October 1943 as Oberfeldwebel and pilot in the 2./Jagdgeschwader 54
 449th Oak Leaves on 11 April 1944 as Leutnant (war officer) pilot in the 1./Jagdgeschwader 54
 113th Swords on 25 November 1944 as Oberleutnant (war officer) and Staffelkapitän of the 2./Jagdgeschwader 54

Notes

References

Citations

Bibliography

External links
 

Luftwaffe pilots
German World War II flying aces
Recipients of the Gold German Cross
Recipients of the Knight's Cross of the Iron Cross with Oak Leaves and Swords
Silesian-German people
People from Bruntál District
Aviators killed by being shot down
Luftwaffe personnel killed in World War II
1917 births
1945 deaths